North Engadine is a locality in southern Sydney, in the state of New South Wales, Australia. It is located in the northern part of the suburb of Engadine.

Sydney localities
Sutherland Shire